This is a list of named geological features on 21 Lutetia. There are 37 officially named features on Lutetia, of which:
 19 (51%) are craters,
 8 (21%) are Regiones,
 3 (8%) are Labes,
 2 (5%) are Fossae,
 2 (5%) are Rimae,
 2 (5%) are Rupes, and
 1 (3%) is a Dorsum.

21 Lutetia was flown by in July 2010 by the Rosetta spacecraft, while en route to comet 67P/Churyumov–Gerasimenko. As Lutetia is named after the Roman town that would later become Paris, most features on Lutetia are named after places in Europe during the Roman era.

Craters 
Impact craters on 21 Lutetia are named after cities in Europe around the Roman era. Based on the images taken of the northern side of Lutetia by Rosetta, it is suspected there is a large crater named Suspicio crater on the southern side of Lutetia, however it has not been directly imaged, so it remains unconfirmed, and therefore is not included in this list.

Dorsa 
Dorsa on 21 Lutetia are named after rivers in Europe around the Roman era. Ticinum Dorsum might be associated with Suspicio Crater, on the far side of Lutetia.

Fossae 
Fossae on 21 Lutetia are named after rivers in Europe around the Roman era. Hiberus Fossa is associated with a large (~40 km) unnamed crater composed partially of Danuvius Labes, Gallicum Labes, and Sarnus Labes. Sequana Fossa might be associated with Suspicio Crater, on the far side of Lutetia.

Labes 
Labes on 21 Lutetia are named after rivers in Europe around the Roman era. All of these features partially make up a large (~40 km) unnamed crater on the near side of Lutetia.

Regiones 
Most Regiones on 21 Lutetia are named after provinces of the Roman Empire, with the exception of Goldschmidt Regio.

Rimae 
Rimae on 21 Lutetia are named after rivers in Europe around the Roman era. Tiberis Rimae is associated with Massilia crater, and Rhodanus Rimae is associated with a large (~40 km) unnamed crater composed partially of Danuvius Labes, Gallicum Labes, and Sarnus Labes.

Rupes 
Rupes on 21 Lutetia are named after rivers in Europe around the Roman era. Glana Rupes might be associated with Suspicio Crater, on the far side of Lutetia.

References 

Geological features on main-belt asteroids
Surface features of bodies of the Solar System